William Frederick Thomas Brown (born 7 February 1943) is an English former professional footballer who played as a forward. His professional clubs included Portsmouth, Brentford and Gillingham, for whom he made over 100 Football League appearances. Either side of his spell in the Football League, Brown had a long career in non-League football.

Personal life 
As of October 1969, Brown was running his own haulage business. As of 2014, he was living in Essex.

Career statistics

References

1943 births
Living people
Footballers from Croydon
English footballers
Association football forwards
Southampton F.C. players
Charlton Athletic F.C. players
Romford F.C. players
Chelmsford City F.C. players
Bedford Town F.C. players
Gillingham F.C. players
Portsmouth F.C. players
Brentford F.C. players
Margate F.C. players
Dunstable Town F.C. players
Redbridge F.C. players
Southern Football League players
English Football League players